The 2003–04 Canadian network television schedule indicates the fall prime time schedules for Canada's major English broadcast networks. For schedule changes after the fall launch, please consult each network's individual article.

2003 official fall schedule

Sunday

Monday

Tuesday

Wednesday

Thursday

Friday

Saturday

Top weekly ratings 
 Note: English Canadian television only by viewers age 2 and up
 Data sources: BBM Canada official website

References

External links
BBM Canada Top Weekly Television Ratings

2003 in Canadian television
2004 in Canadian television
Canadian television schedules